Sebastiano's' is a Sicilian delicatessen, bakery, and market in Portland, Oregon's Montavilla neighborhood, in the United States.

Description 
Sebastiano's is a Sicilian delicatessen and bakery in the southeast Portland part of the Montavilla neighborhood. The restaurant has served arancini, focaccia, muffuletta, pizzas, sandwiches, meats, cheese, cannoli, cuccidati, and wine, and the Italian market has stocked staples like farro, olive oil, pesto, and sauces. Other desserts have included brownies, cookies, and olive oil cake. The deli has also served granita.

History 

Inspired by a trip to Sicily, Daniel and Elise Gold opened Sebastiano's on June 2, 2020, in a space which previously housed Heartbreaker Neighborhood Kitchen. The couple announced plans to launch a food cart for weekend operation in the deli's parking lot in 2021. The food cart Aperitivo Sebastiano began operating in May. Sebastiano's has been a vendor at the neighborhood's Thursdays on the Plaza market.

For Thanksgiving in 2021, Sebastiano's collaborated with Dimo's Apizza on a takeout dinner. In 2022, Daniel Gold testified at a hearing, urging Portland City Council to extend the cap on fees third-party delivery apps can charge restaurants.

Reception 
In 2022, writers included the Eggplant Muffuletta in Portland Monthly list of the city's 11 best sandwiches. The magazine's Karen Brooks and Katherine Chew Hamilton included the business in "An Opinionated Guide to Portland’s Best Bakeries", in which they said "the cannoli are the best in town". Brooks also included Sebastiano's in Portland Monthly's 2022 list of "Our Favorite Patios for Drinking & Soaking Up Sun".

Brooke Jackson-Glidden included Sebastiano's in Eater Portland 2021 lists of "The Ideal Portland Spots to Load Up on Picnic Supplies" and "15 Portland Restaurants Where You Can Also Buy Your Groceries". The website's Alex Frane included the business in a 2022 list of "15 Stellar Italian Restaurants in Portland". He and Nathan Williams included Sebastiano's in a 2022 overview of "Where to Drink and Dine in Historic Montavilla". Additionally, Michelle Lopez and Jackson-Glidden included the business in the 2022 list of "Outstanding Bakeries in Portland and Beyond".

See also 

 List of bakeries
 List of delicatessens
 List of Italian restaurants

References

External links 

 
 

2020 establishments in Oregon
Bakeries of Oregon
Delicatessens in Oregon
Italian restaurants in Portland, Oregon
Montavilla, Portland, Oregon
Restaurants established in 2020
Retail markets in the United States
Southeast Portland, Oregon